Third at Heart (French: Tierce à coeur) is a 1947 French comedy film directed by Jacques de Casembroot and starring Georges Grey, Sophie Desmarets and Henri Guisol.

Cast
 Georges Grey as Jérôme de Latour Martin
 Henri Guisol as Jasmin
 Sophie Desmarets as Gaby
 Paul Amiot as Le président du tribunal
 Jacqueline Porel as Dina
 Pauline Carton as Marguerite
 Francine Claudel as Lorraine
 Henri de Livry as Le livreur
 Albert Michel as Bastien

References

Bibliography 
 Rège, Philippe . Encyclopedia of French Film Directors, Volume 1. Scarecrow Press, 2009.

External links 
 

1947 films
1947 comedy films
French comedy  films
1940s French-language films
Films directed by Jacques de Casembroot
1940s French films